Christian-Joseph Guyonvarc'h (18 October 1926, Auray – 9 January 2012, Guilers) was a Breton philologist and linguist who specialised in Celtic studies.

Biography 
Christian-Joseph Guyonvarc'h was born on 18 October 1926 in Auray, Brittany (France), and grew up in a French-Breton bilingual environment. Along with his wife,  (1927–2004), he wrote numerous works on Celtic studies, including Les Druides (1986), La Civilisation celtique (1990), La Société celtique (1991), Les Fêtes celtiques (1995), and Les Royaumes Celtiques (2001). Georges Dumézil directed Le Roux's first studies, and was president of the jury at Guyonvarc'h's doctorate thesis in 1980.

Guyonvarc'h taught Old Irish and Breton at Rennes 2 University. He died on 9 January 2012 in Guilers.

Guyonvarc'h could speak Breton, Welsh, and Irish (in their modern and historical stages), as well as modern French, German, Dutch, English. From 1979 to 1981, he was a member the patronage committee of Nouvelle École, the annual magazine of the ethno-nationalist think tank, GRECE.

Works 

 Dictionnaire étymologique du Breton ancien, moyen et moderne, Rennes, 1973
Textes Mythologiques Irlandais, Rennes, Ogam-Celticum, n° 11/1 & 2, 1978
Morrigan-Bodb-Macha : la souveraineté guerrière de l'Irlande (1983)
 Aux origines du breton : Le glossaire vannetais du Chevalier Arnold von Harff, voyageur allemand du XVe, Ogam-Celticum, 1984, study realized by Christian J. Guyonvarc'h
 Les Druides, with Françoise Le Roux, Ouest-France Université, coll. « De mémoire d’homme : l’histoire », Rennes, 1986 
 La Civilisation celtique, with Françoise Le Roux, Ouest-France Université, series De mémoire d’homme : l’histoire, Rennes, 1990 
 La Société celtique, with Françoise Le Roux, Ouest-France Université, series De mémoire d’homme : l’histoire, Rennes, 1991, 
  La razzia des vaches de Cooley (translation of the Táin Bó Cúailnge), Éditions Gallimard, 1994, 
 Les Fêtes celtiques, with Françoise Le Roux, Ouest-France Université, series De mémoire d’homme : l’histoire, Rennes, 1995 
 Magie, médecine et divination chez les Celtes, Bibliothèque scientifique Payot, Paris, 1997 
 Le Dialogue des deux Sages, Bibliothèque scientifique Payot, Paris, 1999, 
 La légende de la ville d'Is, with Françoise Le Roux, Ouest-France Université, cseries De mémoire d'homme : l'histoire, Rennes, 2000 
Les Royaumes Celtiques (2001)
Sacrifice dans la tradition celtique (2005).
 Le Catholicon, reprint of the Jehan Calvez edition owned by the city of Rennes (5 November 1499), éditions Ogam, Rennes, 1975, reprinted by éditions Armeline, Brest, 2005
 Le Sacrifice dans la tradition celtique, éditions Armeline, Brest, 2005,

References

Bibliography
 

People from Auray
1926 births
2012 deaths
French philologists
French lexicographers
Breton-language writers
Linguists of Breton